Santiago Cabanas Ansorena (born 1954) is a Spanish diplomat, serving as Ambassador to the United States since 2018.

Biography 
Born on 23 March 1954 in Madrid, Cabanas earned a licentiate degree in Law from the Autonomous University of Madrid (UAM). He joined the diplomatic career in 1981.

He has served in several senior posts at the Ministry of Foreign Affairs, including Director-General of Cultural and Scientific Relations (1996–1998), Director-General of Consular and Migratory Affairs (2010–2011), Director-General of Foreign Policy.

He was destined as Ambassador to the Czech Republic (2000–2004), Jordan (2013–2017) and Algeria (2017–2018). He was also designated as Consul in Miami (2005–2010).

Appointed as Ambassador to the United States in September 2018 in replacement of Pedro Morenés, Cabanas presented his diplomatic credentials to US President Donald Trump on 17 September 2018.

References 

1954 births
Complutense University of Madrid alumni
Ambassadors of Spain to the United States
Ambassadors of Spain to the Czech Republic
Ambassadors of Spain to Algeria
Ambassadors of Spain to Jordan
Living people